Ann Elizabeth Fowler Hodges (also known as Mrs. Hodges, Mrs. Hewlett Hodges, and Mrs. Huelitt Hodges; February 2, 1920  – September 10, 1972) was an American woman known for being the first documented individual not only to be struck by a meteorite, but also to live through the encounter.

Meteorite impact 
At 12:46 PM (CST) on November 30, 1954, a meteorite fell through the skies of Sylacauga, Alabama. It split into at least 3 fragments, with one of the fragments falling through a roof and then landing on Mrs. Hodges, who was napping on her couch.  She recalled the meteorite came through her roof around 2:00 PM local time, although the official time the meteorite flew through the sky was 12:46 PM. The meteorite left a three-foot-wide hole in the roof of her house, bounced off of a radio, and hit her on her upper thigh and hand, giving her a large bruise.

Mrs. Hodges and her mother, who was in the house at the time, thought the chimney had collapsed as there was a lot of dust and debris. Once they noticed the large rock, they called both the police and fire department. Ann's husband, Eugene Hodges, came home later that evening at about 6:00 PM local time, unaware of what had happened to his wife. Mrs. Hodges filled him in by indicating there was a "little excitement." That night she did not sleep well and ended up going to the hospital the next day due to being distressed from the incident, rather than from her physical injury, which was said to be only the large bruise on her upper thigh.

After the incident 

Members from the Maxwell Air Force Base went to the Hodges home to look at and confiscate the meteorite. They confirmed its identity as a chondrite meteorite. The Mayor of Sylacauga, Ed J. Howard, originally intended to give it to the Alabama Museum of Natural History (AMNH) of the University of Alabama. Mr. Hodges stated that he had "enough evidence that the thing fell in my house" and the meteorite was eventually given back to the Hodgeses. Although the meteorite had crashed through the Hodges home and hit Mrs. Hodges, the owner of the house, Birdie Guy, declared ownership. After a year-long legal battle, Mrs. Guy and the Hodgeses agreed on a $500 settlement and Mrs. Hodges was able to keep the meteorite.

Ann Hodges had immense, although short-term, notoriety for the incident. About 200 reporters were waiting to talk to her outside of her house, most of whom were unwelcome. Ann was invited to and attended the game show I’ve Got a Secret hosted by Garry Moore. Mrs. Hodges also received lots of fan mail and questions, although she did not reply to them. 

Mr. Hodges indicated they had received several offers for the meteorite while it was at the Air Force Base, but could not accept offers since it was not in their possession. One offer, he states, was close to $5,500. By the time the meteorite was returned to Ann following the legal battle with Mrs. Guy, they could not find a buyer, since the excitement of the event had dwindled. In 1956, Mrs. Hodges decided to sell the meteorite to the Alabama Museum of Natural History, against her husband's wishes, and as he recalled, for about $25.

Personal life 
Eugene claimed that following the incident, Ann's behavior changed. Her health problems worsened, her shyness became social anxiety, and she suffered from what appeared to be PTSD. Ann and Eugene Hodges would later get divorced in 1964, and they had no children.

Death 
Hodges died in a nursing home from kidney failure on September 10, 1972. Her ex-husband, Eugene Hodges, died in 2012.

Legacy 
The meteorite that flew through the sky that night was named the Sylacauga meteorite and the fragment that hit Mrs. Hodges was aptly named the Hodges Fragment. Another fragment from the original meteorite was sold to the Smithsonian, while the Hodges Fragment remains on exhibit at the Alabama Museum of Natural History. 

The radio that was hit by the meteorite was later loaned to the American Museum of Natural History in 2005 by Eugene Hodges, fifty years after the impact event. 

The titular poem in Space Struck by Paige Lewis was inspired by the event, describing its aftermath from Hodges' point of view. 

The November 20th episode of the History Channel's podcast, History This Week, "A Meteorite Hits Ann Hodges" was devoted to her story.

References

External links 
 Exhibits - Alabama Museum of Natural History

Wikipedia Student Program
1920 births
1972 deaths
People from Sylacauga, Alabama
 deaths from kidney failure